Christmas with The Miracles is a seasonal favorites' album by Motown soul group The Miracles which was recorded in 1963. The album charted for 6 weeks, peaking at number 15 on Billboards Christmas Record album chart on December 11, 1965. It features traditional Christmas songs, with one Smokey Robinson original, "Christmas Everyday". The album was produced by Miracles member Ronnie White. Miracle Pete Moore was serving in the U.S. Armed Services at the time the cover photograph was taken, and was not on the cover photograph, nor was Miracle Marv Tarplin.

Track listing
All lead vocals by Smokey Robinson, except where noted.Side One "Santa Claus Is Coming to Town" (J. Fred Coots, Haven Gillespie) – 1:52
 "Let It Snow" (Sammy Cahn, Jule Styne) – 1:39 (lead: Claudette Robinson)
 "Winter Wonderland" (Felix Bernard, Richard B. Smith) – 2:18 (Lead: group)
 "Christmas Everyday" (Smokey Robinson) – 2:27 (lead: Smokey Robinson with Bobby Rogers)
 "I'll Be Home for Christmas" (Walter Kent, Kim Gannon) – 2:25 (lead: Ronnie White)Side Two'
 "The Christmas Song" (Mel Tormé, Bob Wells) – 2:37
 "White Christmas" (Irving Berlin) – 3:04 (lead: Ronnie White with Smokey Robinson)
 "Silver Bells" (Jay Livingston, Ray Evans) – 2:00
 "Noel" (Traditional) – 2:28
 "O Holy Night" (Adolphe Adam) – 2:10

This album was mastered for compact disc by John Matousek at Motown/Hitsville U.S.A. Recording Studios, Hollywood, California, and was released on CD in 1987.

Personnel 
 Smokey Robinson –  lead vocals
 Ronnie White, Bobby Rogers, Warren "Pete" Moore, Claudette Robinson –  background vocals
 Marv Tarplin –  guitar
 The Funk Brothers –  instrumentation
 Ronald White, producer

References

1963 Christmas albums
Christmas albums by American artists
The Miracles albums
Tamla Records albums
Covers albums
Albums produced by Ronald White
Rhythm and blues Christmas albums
Albums recorded at Hitsville U.S.A.
Albums produced by Smokey Robinson